The Revenge of Frankenstein is a 1958 Technicolor British horror film made by Hammer Film Productions. Directed by Terence Fisher, the film stars Peter Cushing, Francis Matthews, Michael Gwynn and Eunice Gayson. In the United States, it was released in June, 1958 with Curse of the Demon on the lower half of the double bill.

The Revenge of Frankenstein was a sequel to The Curse of Frankenstein, the studio's 1957 adaptation of Mary Shelley's 1818 novel Frankenstein; or, The Modern Prometheus and the second instalment in their Frankenstein series.

Plot
In 1860, Baron Victor Frankenstein, sentenced to death, escapes execution by the guillotine by having a priest beheaded and buried in his place with the aid of a hunchback named Karl. Three years later, Victor, now going by the alias Doctor Stein, has become a successful physician in Carlsbrück, catering to the wealthy while also attending to the poor in a paupers' hospital. Hans Kleve, a junior member of the medical council, recognizes Victor and, being an admirer, requests an apprenticeship with him. Together with Karl, Victor and Hans continue with the Baron's experiment: transplanting a living brain into a new body, one that is not a crude, cobbled-together creature. The deformed Karl is more than willing to volunteer his brain thereby gaining a healthy body, particularly after meeting Margaret, the lovely new assistant at the hospital.

The transplant succeeds, but when the excited Hans tells Karl that he will be a medical sensation, Karl panics and convinces Margaret to free him. Hans notes that the chimpanzee into which Victor had transplanted the brain of an orangutan ate its mate and worries about Karl, but his concerns are brushed off by Victor. Karl flees from the hospital and hides in Victor’s laboratory, where he burns his preserved hunchback body. He is attacked by a drunken janitor, who takes him for a burglar, but manages to kill the man. Victor and Hans discover Karl is missing and begin searching for him.

The next morning, Margaret finds Karl in her aunt's stable. While she goes to fetch Hans, Karl experiences difficulties with his arm and leg. When Hans and Margaret arrive, he is gone. At night, Karl ambushes and strangles a local girl. The next night, he rushes into an evening reception. Having redeveloped his deformities, he begs Victor for help, using his real name of Frankenstein, before he collapses and dies. Victor, disregarding Hans' pleas that he should leave the country, appears before the medical council, where he denies being the infamous Frankenstein. The unsatisfied councilors open Victor's supposed grave, only to discover the priest's body, and conclude that the real Frankenstein is still alive.

At the hospital, the patients violently attack Victor out of hatred, and Hans rushes his dying mentor to the lab. The police arrive to arrest Victor, but when Hans shows them Victor's dead body, they leave. Hans then transplants Victor's brain into a new body that Victor had prepared earlier, which he made to resemble him. Sometime later in London, Hans assists Victor, now calling himself Doctor Franck, in welcoming some patients.

Cast

Production
According to Jimmy Sangster, James Carreras presold the film in America, taking a poster with him. When Carreras returned he approached Sangster with the project asking him to write the sequel. Sangster responded, "I killed (Baron) Frankenstein in the first film." Sangster stated that Carreras told him he had six weeks to write the project before shooting started and that "you'll think of something".

The film was shot at Bray Studios and production commenced on January 6, 1958, three days after filming wrapped on Dracula (1958), which likewise starred Cushing and was directed by Fisher.

Conductor and composer Leonard Salzedo was hired to write the score, and most of the regular Hammer crew returned in other roles, including Jack Asher as cinematographer, Bernard Robinson on design and Phil Leakey on make-up.

Novelization
Three novelizations of the film were published. The first one by Jimmy Sangster (using the pen name Hurford Janes) was published by Panther Books in 1958; the second was by John Burke as part of his 1966 Pan book The Hammer Horror Film Omnibus. A third novelization, by Shaun Hutson was published in March 2013.

Critical reception 
Variety called The Revenge of Frankenstein "a high grade horror film" with "rich" production values and a script that was "well-plotted, peopled with interesting characters, aided by good performances." Motion Picture Daily noted, "a horror picture turned out with creative skill and imagination. The most notable contribution the Hammers have made to the genre is their stunning use of color for frightening effects". Hammer Films "have demolished once and for all the theory that horror films should always be in black-and-white". Harrison's Reports declared it "a first-rate picture of its kind."
The Monthly Film Bulletin was negative, writing: "A contrived plot and a notable lack of pace and imagination are responsible for the failure of this lavish and painstaking production to be convincing even on the level of a horror film. Peter Cushing's stylish and diffident performance serves only to underline the farcical effects of a crude and pedestrian handling of the little legitimate horror left."

, The Revenge of Frankenstein holds an 87% approval rating on the review aggregator website Rotten Tomatoes, based on 15 reviews.

See also
 Frankenstein in popular culture
 List of films featuring Frankenstein's monster

References

Sources

External links

 
 

1958 films
1950s historical horror films
1958 horror films
British historical horror films
British science fiction horror films
American monster movies
British sequel films
Columbia Pictures films
Hammer Film Productions horror films
Frankenstein films
1950s monster movies
Films directed by Terence Fisher
Films set in 1860
Films set in 1863
Films set in Europe
Films shot at Bray Studios
Films with screenplays by Jimmy Sangster
1950s English-language films
1950s American films
1950s British films